Hongqiao Town may refer to the following locations in China:
 Hongqiao, Hebei, in Yutian County
 Hongqiao, Pingjiang, in Pingjiang County, Hunan province.
 Hongqiao, Minhang District, Shanghai